The Seaforth 24 is an American trailerable sailboat that was designed by Stephen Seaton as a cruiser and first built in 1977.

Production
The design was initially built by Capson Marine in 1977 and then by Precision Boat Works in Palmetto, Florida, United States, but it is now out of production.

Design
The Seaforth 24 is a recreational keelboat, built predominantly of fiberglass, with wood trim. It has a masthead sloop rig with a bowsprit and a boomkin to support the backstay. The hull has a spooned raked stem, an angled transom, a keel-hung rudder controlled by a tiller and a fixed long keel. It displaces  and carries  of ballast.

The design has sleeping accommodation for four people, with a double "V"-berth in the bow cabin and two quarter berths in the main cabin. The galley is located on the port side just forward of the companionway ladder. The galley is equipped with a single-burner stove and a sink.

Operational history
In a 2010 review Steve Henkel wrote, "Steve Seaton, the naval architect behind this little packet, has since been a designer of large power yachts. The craft he drew here is a well-made, pretty vessel that is capable of cruising along coasts—say passages from Long Island Sound to Block Island Sound to Narragansett Bay to Buzzards Bay to Vineyard Sound to Nantucket Sound—despite her modest LOD ... Best features: Sturdy, reasonably fast (we hear), and easy on the eyes if you enjoy traditional designs. Worst features: Trailering 6,100 pounds on the highway (including all the stuff you'll need for the two-week cruise you'll be starting when you get to your trailer-ramp destination requires a big truck or SUV to tow the load safely and without incident."

See also
List of sailing boat types

References

External links
Photo of a Seaforth 24
Photo of a Seaforth 24 showing the keel and rudder configuration

Keelboats
1970s sailboat type designs
Sailing yachts
Trailer sailers
Sailboat type designs by Stephen Seaton
Sailboat types built by Precision Boat Works